The AACTA International Award for Best Lead Actress is an award that is presented by the Australian Academy of Cinema and Television Arts (AACTA), for a performance by a female actor in a film made outside Australia. It was first handed out by the Academy after its establishment in 2011 by the Australian Film Institute (AFI). The winners and nominees for 2011 were determined by a jury. The award was presented at the inaugural AACTA International Awards in Los Angeles, on 27 January 2012.

Winners and nominees 

In the following table, the winner is listed first, marked in a separate colour, and highlighted in boldface; the nominees are those that are listed below the winner, and not highlighted or in boldface.

2010s

2020s

Multiple wins and nominations

The following individuals received two or more Best Actress awards:

The following individuals received two or more Best Actress nominations:

See also 

 AACTA Award for Best Actress in a Leading Role
 AACTA Awards

References

External links 

 

A
AACTA Award winners
Film awards for lead actress